Anne Kristen (7 March 1937 – 7 August 1996) was a Scottish actress, best known for portraying Olive Rowe in Coronation Street. Her longest-lasting role was as Miss Meiklejohn in Hamish Macbeth. She also appeared in Wings as Molly Farmer, and in Casualty as receptionist Norma Sullivan.

Early life and education 
Kristen was born in 1937 in Strathclyde, Glasgow, growing up in the suburb of Bearsden. Her father, Reginald Byles, was a senior journalist and lead writer for the Glasgow Herald. She acted in plays at the Laurel Bank school in Glasgow. After leaving school, she went on to study at the Royal College of Music and Dramatic Art in Glasgow, where she won a Silver Medal for her work. Kristen then went on to further stage work in Scotland and London before embarking on a television career.

Career

Early television career 
Kristen's first role was on BBC Sunday-Night Play in 1960, for one episode, as the character Nellie Watson. She then appeared in Doctor Finlay's Casebook for two episodes in 1963 and 1966, and throughout the 1960s she made numerous one-episode appearances in various TV series. She was in The Expert for 3 episodes in 1969. The most famous act from Kristen's debut was her role in Coronation Street, in 1971, as Olive Rowe.

Regular TV appearances 
Between her debut and her death in 1996, Kristen continued making regular one-episode television appearances, such as in Z-Cars in 1973 and The Prime of Miss Jean Brodie in 1978. Other notable TV series in which she played a role were Play For Today  (two episodes in 1976 and 1981), Grange Hill (two episodes in 1983) and Minder (two episodes in 1985). She also played Professor Maggie McLeish in Taggart, a Scottish detective television program taking place in her birth town of Glasgow, for two episodes in 1986 and 1994.

Longest-lasting TV roles 

 Kristen appeared in Wings as Molly Farmer, for one episode in 1976. She then came back for 15 episodes throughout 1977 and 1978.
 She played in King's Royal as Mrs. Veitch for 14 episodes in 1982–1983.
 Between 1991 and 1993, she was in multiple episodes of Casualty (TV series) as receptionist Norma Sullivan.
 The longest-lasting role from Kristen in was as Miss Meiklejohn in  Hamish Macbeth. She played 17 episodes in 1995 and 1996.

Film 
Silent Scream (1990) was the first and only film Kristen appeared in.

Personal life 
Kristen was married to the actor Iain Cuthbertson from January 1964 until their divorce in 1988.

Death 
Kristen died of pancreatic cancer on 7 August 1996. Her ashes are buried in Ancrum Churchyard, beside her mother and father, in Roxburghshire.

External links
 
 Obituary in The Independent

1937 births
1996 deaths
Scottish soap opera actresses
Scottish television actresses
20th-century British actresses
Deaths from cancer in Scotland
Deaths from pancreatic cancer
20th-century British businesspeople